St. Michael's Cathedral is the mother church of the Diocese of Springfield in Massachusetts, United States, established in 1847. In 1974 the church and rectory were included as contributing properties in the Quadrangle–Mattoon Street Historic District, listed on the National Register of Historic Places.

History

The parish was established in 1847 as the church of St. Benedict after years of local Catholics fighting Protestant opposition to establish a parish.  The congregation purchased a former Baptist church which served as its first home. For the first five years, it had no pastor when the Rev. Michael P. Gallagher was assigned to serve the parish. Gallagher began construction of the current sanctuary on State Street in Springfield, Massachusetts in 1860, and completed in 1861, based on plans from noted Brooklyn architect Patrick Keely. In recognition of Fr. Gallagher's work, the parish changed its name to St. Michael at this time. Fr. Gallagher died in 1869 and is buried at the church entrance. When Pope Pius IX established the present Diocese of Springfield in Massachusetts in 1870, St. Michael's church became its cathedral.

The structure was expanded in 1996, with the addition of the Bishop Marshall Center at the rear of the church. The center includes a chapel that seats 60 people, a TV studio for the daily broadcast of the Mass, a parish hall that can seat 120 people and kitchen, and it is handicap accessible.

From the year 2000, the cathedral has been home to The Cathedral Choir of Boys and Adults, whose purpose is to serve the bishop, sing at ordinations and other high masses, and perform the annual festival of Lessons and Carols and Tenebrae service during Advent and Lent, respectively. Along with their normal duties, the choir offers basic music theory training to the boys of the choir.

See also

List of Catholic cathedrals in the United States
List of cathedrals in the United States
 Saint Michael: Roman Catholic traditions and views

References

External links 

Official site
Diocese of Springfield official site

Roman Catholic Diocese of Springfield in Massachusetts
Michael's in Springfield
1860s architecture in the United States
Churches in Springfield, Massachusetts
19th-century Roman Catholic church buildings in the United States
Religious organizations established in 1847
Tourist attractions in Springfield, Massachusetts
1847 establishments in Massachusetts
Roman Catholic churches completed in 1861
Historic district contributing properties in Massachusetts
Churches on the National Register of Historic Places in Massachusetts
National Register of Historic Places in Springfield, Massachusetts